The men's large hill team ski jumping competition for the 2018 Winter Olympics in Pyeongchang, South Korea, was held on 19 February 2018 at the Alpensia Ski Jumping Stadium.

Qualification

Teams which had qualified for this event included:

Results

References

Ski jumping at the 2018 Winter Olympics
Men's events at the 2018 Winter Olympics